List of radio stations in the Western Region and Western North Region of Ghana in no particular order

List of radio stations

See also
Media of Ghana
 List of newspapers in Ghana
 List of radio stations in Ghana
Telecommunications in Ghana
New Media in Ghana

References 

Western